McDougall Mills is an unincorporated place on the Marchington River between Botsford Lake and the McDougall Falls downstream and Marchington Lake upstream in Unorganized Kenora District in northwestern Ontario, Canada.

It lies on the Canadian National Railway transcontinental main line, between Rosnel to the west and Ghost River to the east, and is passed but not served by Via Rail transcontinental Canadian trains.

References

Communities in Kenora District